The Battle of Larga was fought between 65,000 Crimean Tatars cavalry and 15,000 Ottoman infantry under Qaplan II Giray against 38,000 Russians under Field-Marshal Rumyantsev on the banks of the Larga River, a tributary of the Prut River, in Moldavia (now in Moldova), for eight hours on 7 July 1770. It was fought on the same day as Battle of Chesma, a key naval engagement of the Russo-Turkish War, 1768–1774. 

The battle was a decisive victory for the Russians who captured 33 Turkish cannons and the vast enemy camp. For this victory, Rumyantsev was awarded the Order of Saint George of the 1st degree. Two weeks later, the Russians scored an even greater victory in the Battle of Kagul.

References
 The Battles of Larga and Kagul

 
Larga
Larga
Larga
1770 in the Ottoman Empire
Russo-Turkish War (1768–1774)